HMCS Quadra is Royal Canadian Navy's cadet training center (CTC) located at Goose Spit in Comox, British Columbia.

History 
HMCS Quadra was first used by cadets in 1943 under the name HMCS Naden (III). The camp was then named Cadet Camp Comox, and renamed HMCS Quadra in 1956. The name comes from the Spanish explorer from the west coast, Bodega y Quadra. In 1952, the center hosted its first group of over 700 boys from Royal Canadian Sea Cadets. Female cadets have been enrolled since 1975.

Courses 
HMCS Quadra offers 13 summer courses;

 General Training 
 Basic Seamanship
 Ship’s Boat Operator
 Boatswain’s Mate
 Basic Drill & Ceremonial
 Drill & Ceremonial Instructor
 Basic Sail,
 Intermediate Sail
 Senior Sail
 Military Band – Basic Musician
 Military Band – Intermediate Musician
 Military Band – Advanced Musician
 Shipwright.

It hosts approximately 900-course cadets annually - mainly sea cadets but can also include army and air. The center also employs over 300 staff including COATS personnel, regular force personnel, reserve force personnel, civilian instructors, DND public servants and staff cadets. Cadets come from across Canada as well as selected international cadets. Quadra has hosted cadets from Australia, Bermuda, Hong Kong, Japan, South Korea, Netherlands, Sweden, the United Kingdom, and the United States of America in past years. When not in use for summer training the center is used for weekend exercises and cadet events.

References

Sources

External links
 Restoring cutter #7
 Canadian Olympic team training at HMCS Quadra

Royal Canadian Navy bases